Koloko is a department or commune of Kénédougou Province in south-western Burkina Faso. Its capital lies at the town of Koloko.

Towns and villages

References

Departments of Burkina Faso
Kénédougou Province